Labeobarbus jaegeri is a species of ray-finned fish in the genus Labeobarbus which is found only in the Sanaga River in Cameroon.

References 

 

Endemic fauna of Cameroon
jaegeri
Fish described in 1930